Ismar Elbogen (September 1, 1874 – August 1, 1943) was a German rabbi, scholar and historian.

Biography 
Yitzhak Moshe (Itamar) Elbogen was born in Posen. He was taught  by his uncle, Jacob Levy, author of the "", and then attended the gymnasium and  the Jewish Theological Seminary in Breslau. He earned his doctorate from the Breslau University and was ordained as a rabbi in 1899.

Academic career
Elbogen served as a lecturer on Biblical exegesis and Jewish history at the Collegio Rabbinico Italiano in Florence. In 1902 he became privat-docent at the Lehranstalt für die Wissenschaft des Judentums in Berlin. He fled Nazi Germany in 1938, and taught  at the Jewish Institute of Religion in New York, the Jewish Theological Seminary and Hebrew Union College.

He is the author of Jewish Liturgy: A Comprehensive History.  Originally published in German in 1913, this book was updated in a number of subsequent Hebrew editions.  The latest Hebrew edition was translated into English by Raymond P. Scheindlin, and published by the Jewish Publication Society in 1993.

This work covers the entire range of Jewish liturgical development, beginning with the early cornerstones of the siddur; through the evolution of the medieval piyyut tradition; to modern prayerbook reform in Germany and the United States. It is the most thorough academic study of the Jewish liturgy ever written.

Published works 
 "Der Tractatus de Intellectus Emendatione und Seine Stellung Innerhalb der Philosophie Spinoza's", Breslau, 1898
 "In Commemorazione di S. D. Luzzatto", Florence, 1901
 "Die Neueste Construction der Jüdischen Geschichte", Breslau, 1902.

References

External links 
 Brief biography from the Gelman Library, George Washington University
 Works by and about Ismar Elbogen in University Library JCS Frankfurt am Main: Digital Collections Judaica
 Ismar Elbogen Collection at the Leo Baeck Institute, New York
Jewish Encyclopedia: "Elbogen, Ismar" by Isidore Singer (1906).

1874 births
1943 deaths
German male non-fiction writers
20th-century German rabbis
Jewish historians
People from Ostrzeszów County